is a mascot character, created by Japanese manga artist  and produced by game goods company Alchemist.

The name is a play on words:  is a kind of charcoal, which is mainly used for cooking. However, -tan is a suffix created by the mispronunciation by young children of -san, that led to the suffix -chan. Relating to this dajare, the main cast is the moe anthropomorphic representations of different types of charcoal.

An anime began airing in February 2006 that was produced by Studio Deen. Animax, who have also broadcast all episodes within respective networks across Southeast Asia, South Asia, East Asia, translating and dubbing the series into English and other languages. The anime is set in Minabe, Wakayama, a location that is the largest producer of binchōtan charcoal in Japan.

Characters
 
 
 The main character in the anime. Binchō-tan is a young girl who lives by herself in an old house far from town and is always barefoot. As her name suggests, she often wears a piece of charcoal on her head. Each episode depicts a day in the life of Binchō-tan who needs to work in order to buy food and necessities. She is assumed to be an orphan because she lives by herself, refuses to answer shopkeepers who ask where her mother is and keeps to her habits of greeting and farewelling herself when traveling. Based on the story she's a hardworking child but willing to do all kinds of jobs given to her, for instance like deodorizing shoes. She is able to change her size, and may have other, unspecified abilities. She also treasures clothing made by her grandmother, which becomes a plot point in one episode. Binchō-tan is initially a very lonely person. Her birthday is on May 7.

 
 
 Kunugi-tan, who is seen many times in the anime before meeting any of the other characters directly, is a rich girl living in a mansion with many servants. Kunugi-tan is still very lonely despite being surrounded by many older people as well as her school peers. Unable to adventure outside her home and school due to her father's strict instructions carried out by her butler, Kunugi-tan often stares into the distance blankly, as if yearning for a bit of freedom. Kunugi-tan takes a great deal of interest in Bincho-tan and attempts to become better acquainted with her. She is terrified of bugs--although she is sometimes depicted with a stag beetle stuck to her dress. Kunugi-tan wears two pieces of what appears to be charcoal in her hair. Her name comes from the charcoal made from the sawtooth oak tree. Her birthday is on April 1.

 
 
 Chiku-tan is an enthusiastic person who enjoys inventing things and helping others. Her hair is held with a piece of bamboo charcoal and the end moves when she has ideas, usually during problems. The viewer sees that like Binchō-tan, Chiku-tan also lives far from town in an old house but lives with others, her younger sister, Chiku-rin and her grandfather. She is afraid of ghosts. Chiku-tan often takes on jobs like Binchō-tan and after meeting, they quickly became friends. Chiku and Binchō also begin raising a dog together. She is named after takesumi; bamboo charcoal, as chikurin means 'bamboo grove'. Her birthday is on August 24.

 
 
 Chiku-tan's younger sister. Chiku-rin often mimics Chiku-tan, but is unable to talk fluently due to her age. Her birthday is on August 6.

 
 
 Aroe is a young girl whose hair is made of Aloe, which does not benefit her as she often requires water. Aroe does not often make direct contact with the other characters in the anime and her appearances are often a side story--although she encounters them at the festival, and at the final scene of the final episode. Aroe's aloe-made hair bursts many of her vinyl wading pools due to its sharpness. Aroe is often seen throughout the series in a dizzy state, sometimes due to needing water and on other occasions due to misfortune. Her birthday is on June 15.

 
 
 It is explained during the story that Ren-tan is a miko and as such enjoys playing a mokugyo and communicating with spirits. When Ren-tan summons spirits, they often approach Chiku-tan, much to her dismay. She lives at a Buddhist temple with her grandparents and enjoys eating dango. She has amazing luck and always wins raffles. On occasion she also wears a pair of glasses Chiku-tan gave to her after helping her with a raffle. Ren-tan means a charcoal briquette, the use of which in several famous suicide pacts implies a connection with the netherworld. Her birthday is on February 10.

 
 
 Kunugi-tan's elder maternal cousin. Her birthday is on March 30.

 
 
 Kunugi-tan's household butler.

 
 
 Kunugi-tan's father. He has acrophobia (a fear of heights).

 
 
 Binchō-tan's favorite character in a television show she watches. He appears on merchandise in one of the town's shops.

 
 

 
 
 Aroe's mother.

 
 Aroe's father.

 
 A Japanese breed of dog called Kishu. He was adopted by Bincho-tan after he followed her to her house in the woods, after she gave him some food from a shop in the town. He was apparently a stray, as he had no collar when Bincho met him. He was given a collar made with one of the large nuts seen in the series. He was also given a kennel, made with one of Chiku-tan's inventions after it broke and failed to serve its intended purpose. After giving him a collar, Bincho decided to name him Saji, which, according to her means 'trifle'. Bincho explains to Kunugi, who was present with her at the time, that she chose 'Saji' because the dog had apparently been abandoned, as though it was just "a trifle".

 
 Binchou-tan's mysterious benefactor. Sends her presents on her birthday and on New Year's Eve. His name comes from the oak tree which binchouzumi coal is made.

Media

Manga
 Binchō-tan Vol.1  (Limited edition:) - February 26, 2006
 Binchō-tan Vol.2  (Limited edition:) - March 30, 2007

Anime
Nine episodes out of twelve episodes were aired without ending theme on TBS and BS-i. MBS in Kansai broadcast all episodes with ending theme. Incidentally, Wakayama in Kansai is famous for the production of binchōtan and Binchō-tan is the mascot of  operated by Minabegawa Forestry Society in Minabe, Wakayama.

Music
The soundtrack of this animation includes the instrument Ondes Martenot.

Opening theme
  : Eps. 01 - 12
 Lyrics and composition by: rino
 Arrangement by: Kaoru Okubo
 Performed by: CooRie

Ending theme
 "Bincho Ondo" (びんちょう音頭) : Eps. 01 - 12
 Lyrics by: Takahito Ekusa
 Composition by: Seiya Imakawa(LOOPCUBE)
 Arrangement by: Yūjirō Okazaki
 Performed by: Mai Kadowaki

DVD Releases
 Bincho-tan Vol.1 - May 26, 2006
 Bincho-tan Vol.2 - June 23, 2006
 Bincho-tan Vol.3 - July 28, 2006

Audio CDs
  - February 8, 2006
  - February 24, 2006
 Soundtrack - March 24, 2006
 Characters' CD
 Bincho-tan Character CD Vol.1 - November 25, 2005
 Bincho-tan Character CD Vol.2 - December 22, 2005
 Drama CD
 Bincho-tan Drama CD Vol.1 - January 25, 2006
 Bincho-tan Drama CD Vol.2 - February 24, 2006
 Bincho-tan Drama CD Vol.3 - March 24, 2006

Book
 Guide book - January 26, 2006

Video game
The  for PlayStation 2 and its limited edition were released by Marvelous Interactive on April 26, 2007.

References

External links
Takahito Ekusa's website 
Official website (Alchemist) 
Anime official website 
Official website for video game (Marvelous Interactive) 

2003 manga
2006 anime television series debuts
2007 video games
IG Port franchises
Japan-exclusive video games
Mag Garden manga
Mainichi Broadcasting System original programming
Marvelous Entertainment
Moe anthropomorphism
PlayStation 2 games
PlayStation 2-only games
Seinen manga
Studio Deen
TBS Television (Japan) original programming
Video games developed in Japan
Wakayama Prefecture in fiction